USS Green Bay (PG-101) was an  in the United States Navy. She has since been transferred to the Hellenic Navy under the name HS Tolmi (P-229).

United States Navy service
Green Bay was laid down on 6 November 1966 as PGM-101 by Peterson Builders in Sturgeon Bay, Wisconsin.  While under construction, she was reclassified as Patrol Gunboat, PG-101 on 1 April 1967.

She was launched on 14 June 1969 and was commissioned as USS Green Bay (PG-101) on 5 December 1969 at the Boston Navy Yard in Charlestown, Massachusetts.

Green Bay was home-ported in Little Creek, Virginia, and made numerous trips to Guantanamo Bay, Cuba, to serve in the role of the aggressor in fleet exercises. In addition, Green Bay participated in many exercises that simulated the deployment of Navy Seals and US Marines onto hostile shores. On 9 August 1974, Green Bay was nominated, by COMPHIBLANT (Commander Amphibious Forces Atlantic) for the Arleigh Burke Award.

She was decommissioned 22 April 1977 at Naval Amphibious Base Little Creek, Virginia, and was struck from the Navy Register on 1 October 1977.

Hellenic Navy service
Green Bay was transferred to Greece on 30 June 1989 as the corvette Tolmi (P-229) and was commissioned on 18 June 1991.

Since 2002, Tolmi has been stationed at Salamis Naval Base. Her main duties include patrolling the Aegean Sea.

References

 

Gunboats of the United States Navy
Asheville-class gunboats
Ships built by Peterson Builders
1969 ships
Asheville-class gunboats of the Hellenic Navy